The Greenville Togs were a Texas–Oklahoma League baseball team based in Greenville, Texas, USA that played during the 1922 season. Notable players include Horace Allen and Tom Lovelace.

References

Baseball teams established in 1922
Baseball teams disestablished in 1922
1922 establishments in Texas
1922 disestablishments in Texas
Defunct minor league baseball teams
Defunct baseball teams in Texas
Texas–Oklahoma League teams